Susan Sojourna Collier is an American television writer and playwright with a background in poetry and playwriting.

Biography
Collier holds a BA in English from Talladega College and a Masters of Fine Arts from Spalding University.

Collier received a Daytime Emmy nomination for her writing on ABC Daytime's All My Children. Collier also wrote for One Life to Live. She collaborated with comedian/actor Tommy Ford (Martin, Who Got Jokes & Harlem Night) to produce a series of sitcoms and films distributed by Lionsgate/Grindstone. The first feature film Conflict of Interest was aired on Aspire TV Network [owned by Magic Johnson] – garnering the largest ratings for the network.  This film premiered at the Las Vegas Black Film Festival, won Best Film at the  BronzeLens Festival and Audience Choice at the Peachtree Village International Film Festival. The second feature, received the Best Feature honor at the Kingdomwood Christian Film Festival, is now available on Urban Movie Channel. In addition, she pinned the screenplay Get the Show on the Road; an adaptation of a romantic comedy novel, which was a semi- finalist in the Tribeca Screenwriting Festival.

As a playwright, Collier has authored four plays produced throughout the east coast and she is the recipient of Playwrights Horizon Theatre's Black Ink Reading Festival, winner of the New York's New Professional Theatre's Writing Festival and Walt Disney Television Writing Fellowship. Her latest musical, Allegory On 125th Street, [music by Grammy nominee Terence Dudley] is being workshopped in Atlanta and New York City.

Crossing over to producing documentary films, Collier's first project, was funded by the Robin Hood Foundation & Brooklyn District Attorney. This documentary received the Honored Feature at the NY Metropolitan Film Festival & Best Doc at NYC Downtown Feature Festival.  This documentary is the center of monthly Community Hall Meetings in Brooklyn to spark conversations regarding solutions to the violence issues. Currently, she is finishing, Through My Lens: A Study of Bullying in the African American Community, a documentary partnership with Tommy Ford and President Obama's My Brother's Keeper Mentor Initiative.

Collier producing credit includes a series of media projects for NBC/Bravo Diversity on the Set campaign – filmed in various US cities. This garnered her a Gold Aurora Award. She's a freelance producer for Al Roker Entertainment, Johwarah Productions (LA), MTV and several other production companies  – developing, producing  & pitching new TV shows and documentaries.

Serving as a mentor for aspiring writers, Collier is an educator and motivational speaker focusing on building self-esteem through writing. Most recently, she was the Creative Writing & Film Production Professor at Abu Dhabi Women's College. She edited the college's first book of poetry – Insights into Emirati Life and curated '80 Seconds' a multimedia art project. She has taught film and writing courses at Gibbs School & School of Visual Art.  In addition, she serves on the Professional Advisory Committee for the Art Institute – NYC, active board member for Manna House School- East Harlem (creative arts center for the youths) and a writing mentor for Girls Write Now, NYC (creative writing program for at-risk girls).  She developed the creative writing workshop Messages to My Younger Brother/ Messages to My Younger Sister focusing on legacy narrative writing as a rehabilitation method. This workshop was implemented at Rikers Island Correctional Facility, Youth and Congregations in Partnership (Brooklyn) & Girls Re-Entry Assistance Support Program.

References

Living people
American soap opera writers
American women writers
Spalding University alumni
Women soap opera writers
Year of birth missing (living people)
21st-century American women